Bekim is an Albanian masculine given name, which means blessing. Notable people named Bekim include:

 Bekim Babić, Bosnia and Herzegovina cross-country skier
 Bekim Balaj, Albanian footballer
 Bekim Bejta, Kosovar Albanian linguist, poet and translator
 Bekim Berisha, Kosovar Albanian soldier
 Bekim Christensen, Danish road bicycle racer
 Bekim Çollaku, former minister of European Integration of Kosovo
 Bekim Dema, Albanian footballer
 Bekim Erkoceviç, Albanian footballer
 Bekim Fehmiu, Yugoslavian theater and film actor of Albanian origin
 Bekim Halilaj, Albanian businessman, president of Luftëtari FC
 Bekim Iliazi, Albanian footballer
 Bekim Isufi, Kosovar footballer and coach
 Bekim Jashari, Kosovo Albanian politician, mayor of Skenderaj since 2017
 Bekim Kapič, Slovenian footballer
 Bekim Kastrati, Albanian footballer
 Bekim Kuli, Albanian footballer

Albanian masculine given names